The 2012 Florida Atlantic Owls football team represented Florida Atlantic University in the 2012 NCAA Division I FBS football season. They were led by first-year head coach Carl Pelini and played their home games at FAU Stadium. They were a member of the Sun Belt Conference. They finished the season 3–9, 2–6 in Sun Belt play to finish in a tie for eighth place.

Schedule

 Source: Schedule

Game summaries

Wagner

Middle Tennessee

Georgia

Alabama

North Texas

Louisiana–Monroe

South Alabama

Troy

Navy

Western Kentucky

FIU

Louisiana–Lafayette

References

Florida Atlantic
Florida Atlantic Owls football seasons
Florida Atlantic Owls football